Reinier Cornelis Bakhuizen van den Brink may refer to:

 Reinier Cornelis Bakhuizen van den Brink (born 1881) (1881–1945), Dutch biologist
 Reinier Cornelis Bakhuizen van den Brink (born 1911) (1911–1987), Dutch biologist, and son of the above
 Reinier Cornelis Bakhuizen van den Brink (born 1810) (1810–1865), Dutch literary critic, historian and philosopher